Sar Cheshmeh is a village in Khafri Rural District, in the Central District of Sepidan County, Fars Province, Iran. At the 2006 census, its population was 31, in 8 families.

References 

Populated places in Sepidan County